George Learmonth (Yuri Andreevich Lermont; 1595s–1633) was a Scottish soldier in Russian service. He entered Russian service in 1613 as the praporshchik (ensign) in the regiment of captain-rittmeister Jacob Shaw.

At least six former members of the Belaia garrison, including George Learmonth, helped decisively turn back Prince Wladyslaw’s troops in intense fighting at Moscow’s Arbat Gates of Bely Gorod during defending Moscow against a Polish army. In that battle, Ensign George Learmonth’s bravery was on display ‘for all to see’. When Lieutenant David Edwards was killed in the defence of Moscow, the Irish soldiers in his company immediately petitioned to have George Learmonth replace him. Newly promoted Lieutenant Yuri Lermont received fifteen rubles per month. During the Smolensk War (1632–1634) he's Rittmeister of Moscouvite Reiters regiment of Charles d'Ebert, under command of Prince Semyon Prozorovsky, died in battle against units of Field Hetman of Lithuania Krzysztof Radziwiłł on 30 August 1633.

Life 
Family history asserted that George Learmonth descended from the famed 13th-century poet-prophet Thomas the Rhymer (also known as Thomas Learmonth). George was the brother of Peter-Patrick Learmonth (born about 1596), who was captured by the Poles whilst in Swedish service, fighting on behalf of Muscovy during Russians hostilities with Poland 1614-1616. He then entered Polish service and commanded troops at Smolensk and Viazma in 1617/1618. Peter Learmont rejoined the Polish Army in 1648.

George Learmonth was the son of Andrew Learmonth and the great-nephew of George Learmonth of Balcomie, who married before 1545 to Lady Euphene Leslie, a daughter of George Leslie, 4th Earl of Rothes and Margaret Crichton (the daughter of William Crichton, 3rd Lord Crichton). Lady Euphene was a sibling of Norman Leslie (b.c. 1518), who would well known for the murder of Archbishop of St Andrews and the last Scottish Cardinal David Beaton. No records have survived concerning George's early career, but it is likely that he was swept up in his kinsman James Spens's large-scale recruiting campaign. George Learmonth probably entered Swedish service in 1610. Like Peter Learmonth, George probably served in the large Russian-Swedish army that was decisively defeated by a smaller Polish army at the battle of Klushino in June 1610.

He had three sons: William, Andrey-Henry and Peter, who all served in the Russian army. Their descendants, the Lermontov noble family, included the 19th-century Romantic writer Mikhail Lermontov.

Notes

References 

1590s births
1633 deaths
Scottish mercenaries
17th-century soldiers
17th-century Scottish people
Military personnel of the Tsardom of Russia
17th-century Russian military personnel
Russian people of Scottish descent
Russian people of the Smolensk War
People from Fife